This is a list of the chapters of the Japanese manga series Death Note, written by Tsugumi Ohba and illustrated by Takeshi Obata. The individual chapters were originally serialized in Shueisha's Weekly Shōnen Jump, from December 2003 to May 2006, with 108 chapters in all. The series primarily focuses on high school student Light Yagami who decides to use a supernatural notebook called the "Death Note", which kills anyone whose name is written in it, to rid the world of evil.

Death Note has been compiled into twelve tankōbon in Japan, with the first being released on April 2, 2004, and the twelfth on July 4, 2006. In addition to these, a guidebook for the manga, Death Note 13: How to Read, was also published on October 13, 2006. The guidebook has information about the series, with character profiles, creator interviews, and the pilot chapter that preceded Death Note. A one-shot story special of Death Note was also released in February 2008, and is set two years after the original story's epilogue; a second one-shot was announced to be in development in April 2019. Death Note has been adapted into an anime with thirty-seven episodes produced by Nippon Television, and has five live-action films.

The Death Note manga is licensed by Viz Media for North American distribution under their "Shonen Jump Advanced" imprint. Viz published the first volume on October 10, 2005, and the last on July 3, 2007. A hardcover version of volume 1 was also released by Viz on September 16, 2008. Viz published Death Note 13: How to Read on February 19, 2008, and collected the Death Note volumes along with Death Note 13: How to Read into a box set on October 7, 2008. On October 4, 2016, all 12 original manga volumes and the February 2008 one-shot were released in a single All-in-One Edition, consisting of 2,400 pages in a single book. The All-in-One Edition was released in English on September 6, 2017, resulting in the February 2008 one-shot being released in English for the first time. A standalone Death Note: Special One Shot written by Ohba and drawn by Obata, was published in February 2020.

Volume list

References

External links

 Viz Media's Death Note website
 Madman Entertainment's Death Note website
 

mf=yes
Death Note